This is a list of automobiles and related vehicles marketed under the Wolseley, Wolseley-Siddeley and Stellite names.

Herbert Austin's cars with horizontal engines
These early designs were by Austin, founder of this business for Vickers. Austin left Wolseley in 1905 and founded his own Austin business.
source

source

source

Siddeley's and other Wolseley cars to 1915

These vehicles had conventional vertical engines
Prior to 1906 the first of these designs had been made by Vickers at their Crayford, Kent works to Siddeley's specifications and marketed by Siddeley Autocar Company Limited

source

Stellite

Designed by Wolseley, made by a sister company, given a new name to protect the Wolseley luxury image, introduced 1914.
Reappeared after the Armistice as Wolseley Ten

source

Inter-war cars 1920 to 1940

Two, four and six-cylinder cars

source

Straight-eight-cylinder cars

source

Badge-engineered Morris cars from 1935

Prewar cars

source

Postwar cars: rear wheel drive

Postwar cars: front wheel drive

Note

References

Wolseley